AH receptor-interacting protein (AIP) also known as aryl hydrocarbon receptor-interacting protein, immunophilin homolog ARA9, or HBV X-associated protein 2 (XAP-2) is a protein that in humans is encoded by the AIP gene. The protein is a member of the FKBP family.

Function 

AIP may play a positive role in aryl hydrocarbon receptor-mediated signalling possibly by influencing its receptivity for ligand and/or its nuclear targeting. AIP is the cellular negative regulator of the hepatitis B virus (HBV) X protein. Further, it's been known to suppress antiviral signaling and the induction of type I interferon by targeting IRF7, a key player in the antiviral signal pathways. AIP consists of an N-terminal FKBP52 like domain and a C-terminal TPR domain.

Mutations and role in disease 

AIP mutations may be the cause of a familial form of acromegaly, familial isolated pituitary adenoma (FIPA). Somatotropinomas (i.e. GH-producing pituitary adenomas), sometimes associated with prolactinomas, are present in most AIP mutated patients.

Interactions 

AIP has been shown to interact with the aryl hydrocarbon receptor, peroxisome proliferator-activated receptor alpha and the aryl hydrocarbon receptor nuclear translocator. Further, it has shown that AIP can interact with IRF7 to exert its novel function of negatively regulating antiviral signal pathways.

References

Further reading